Zoya Fyodorovna Bulgakova (24 December 1914 – 3 February 2017) was a Russian Soviet stage actress and an Honored Artist of the RSFSR (1945). At the time of her death she was the oldest actress in Russia.

Biography
Zoya Bulgakova was born in Novo-Nikolaevsk in 1914 into a large family. Her father was a cab driver. She started acting in the Novosibirsk Youth Theater in 1930, becoming one of the first graduates of the theatrical studio. She acted in the theater for 30 years, playing more than 70 roles. In 1932, she graduated from the school at the Novosibirsk Theatre of Young Spectator (now Novosibirsk Globus Theatre). In 1942 she joined the CPSU.

In 1940 and 1946 she performed at the shows of Children's theater in Moscow. Her name was entered into the Golden Book of Culture of the Novosibirsk region for winning the regional award Honor and Dignity (2001). She  performed the role of Red Riding Hood in theater productions from 1937 to 1955; she also played Gerda in the Snow Queen for three years. Her other roles included the traditional parts in theaters for children: Puss in Boots, Little Humpbacked Horse, Snow Maiden, Cinderella, Bunny-Zaznayka and Mitil. All my life I've played boys and girls. A  transvestite's position is a rarity in the theater, so I never felt the lack of demand. By the way, I have always played boys better than girls. Maybe it was because of the nature of my battle: I climbed roofs, trees and fences sometimes better than other boys.

In honor of the centennial anniversary of the actress on 19 December 2014, five days before her 100th birthday, a recital was held at the theater. She died on 3 February 2017, aged 102.

References

External links
 Зоя Булгакова «Письмо, вложенное в посылку». Видеозапись выступления Зои Булгаковой на 80-летии театра «Глобус» 
 Актрисе «Глобуса» Зое Булгаковой исполнилось 100 лет 

1914 births
2017 deaths
Actors from Novosibirsk
Soviet stage actresses
Honored Artists of the RSFSR
Communist Party of the Soviet Union members
Russian centenarians
Women centenarians